Josip Mihalović (16 January 1814 – 19 February 1891) was a Croatian-Hungarian Cardinal of the Catholic Church and Archbishop of Zagreb from 1870 to 1891.

Biography

Origins 
House of Mihalović (also Mihalovich, Mihalovics, Mihalovits, Mihajlović) was a noble family from Orahovica in Slavonia that originated in Macedonia. In 1716, Emperor Charles VI granted them nobility status because they served as Habsburg officers and had fought against Ottomans during the Hundred Years' Croatian–Ottoman War. By 1763 they were Eastern Orthodox Christians and were known under the name Mihajlović. Their economic and social rise began after their conversion to Catholicism. Several notable men came from House of Mihailović, including composer Ödön (1842–1929), Károly Dragutin (1830–1918), Hugo (1874–1956), Antun (1868–1949), the last ban of Croatia in Austria-Hungary.

Early life and education 
Josip Mihalović was born in a small village of Torda in Hungary (now Vojvodina, Serbia) where he attended lower elementary school. He attended elementary school in Zrenjanin, high school in Szeged and additional schools in Timișoara where he also completed philosophy and theology studies and gained a doctorate in theology. From 1834 he worked in the episcopal office. Mihalović was ordained a priest on 12 August 1836 by Bishop Josip Lonović. In 1837, he became chaplain of the town parish in Timișoara and in 1837 notary of the Holy See. In 1841, he was appointed bishop's secretary, and in 1846 Principal of the Office of Bishops. In February 1848, Mihalović became a canon, and in 1849, a bishop's deputy.

Revolutions of 1848 
During the Hungarian Revolution of 1848, Mihalović sided with the Hungarian rebels. After the revolution was suppressed, he was brought before the Military Court in Timișoara. On 17 November 1848, he was deprived of all services, honorable titles, and estates, and sentenced to four years in prison, out of which he served two in the fortress in the town of Leopold near Nitra in present-day Slovakia. In 1852 he received a pardon and was allowed to serve the next four years as a chaplain in his homeland under constant police surveillance. In October 1855, Mihalović became a parish priest in Dudeștii Vechi. Four years later, he was appointed a dean and a superintendent of the local school. In May 1861, he was made a canon, and in June 1861 a pastor in a local Timișoara factory pastor, and eventually an abbot in Sveti Martin na Muri.

Bishop and cardinal 

In 1868, Mihalović received a nomination for the title of Titular Bishop of Duvno. On 4 May 1870, he was appointed the archbishop of Zagreb, and on 17 July he received episcopal ordination in Vienna. The consecrator was Archbishop Mariano Falcinelli Antoniacci, the titular bishop of Athens. Mihalović was enthroned in Zagreb on 6 August 1870. Mihalović was appointed the archbishop at the time when the Croatian–Hungarian Settlement, a pact signed in 1868, that governed Croatia's political status in the Hungarian-ruled part of Austria-Hungary, was fiercely contested by the Croatian opposition parties, and so, Mihalović was, as a supporter of the ruling Unionist Party, harshly criticised by the Croatian opposition. Ignjat Brlić was one of the fiercest critics of his appointment, described Mihalović's appointment as a breach of the Settlement because the title of the archbishop was given to a foreigner.

On 22 June 1877 Pope Pius IX appointed him to the position of the cardinal-priest at San Pancrazio fuori le mura. He received the cardinal's hat in Rome in St Peter's Basilica on 25 June 1877. Mihalović participated in the 1878 conclave in which Vincenzo Gioacchino Raffaele Luigi Pecci was elected Pope. Emperor Franz Joseph wanted Mihalović to become Archbishop of Zagreb, but Mihalović at first hesitated because of the complex political situation in Croatia at the time, so he decided to resign and seek a transfer to one of the Hungarian dioceses. However, Emperor and church leaders managed to make him change his mind and he eventually stayed.

Before the 1881 Croatian parliamentary election, Mihalović opposed the election of the clergy to the Parliament of Croatia, this was especially directed against the clergy involved with the opposition. Also, Mihalović, at the request of a Hungarian episcopate to secede Međimurje to them, allowed preaching in the Hungarian language in Čakovec. Nevertheless, Mihalović stood for the Croatian interests as well, when he supported the annexation of the Military Frontier (1881) and Bosnia and Herzegovina (1878) by Croatia.

Bishops Mihalović, Haulik and Strossmayer have been very active in promoting church, social, cultural and political life. Mihalović was mostly oriented to church life, especially to the education of young seminarians. In 1878, he initiated the establishment of a male seminary and gymnasium in Zagreb. In addition, he gave financial support for four canons for the students in the seminary. Mihalović appointed Juraj Posilović to the position of editor of the Zagreb Catholic paper (ZKL; 1872–1875). In 1874, Posilović became a regular lecturer at the Theological Faculty of the University of Franz Joseph I. He remained lecturer until his appointment as Bishop of Senj-Modruš. During this period, ZKL published several professional discussions on the occasion of the First Vatican Council including the famous constitution Eternal Shepherd (Vječni pastir, i. e. Pastor Aeternus), which contains the definition of papal infallibility. Liberals accused Jesuits of being the constitution's real authors, which resulted in many priests, bishops and ZKL having to protect them. ZKL also reported that bishop Strossmayer (active member of the liberal People's Party) published parliamentary regulations in his journal, thus accepting them.

1880 reconstruction of the Cathedral 
One of Mihalović's greatest accomplishments was the restoration of the Zagreb Cathedral. In 1874, bishop Strossmayer, who had large estates throughout Slavonia, started collecting funds for the Cathedral reconstruction. One of the promoters of reconstitution was also Josip Stadler. Reconstruction was interrupted on 9 November 1880 by a 6.3 magnitude earthquake that struck Zagreb. Although only one person was killed in the earthquake, it destroyed or damaged many buildings, including the cathedral. From a total of 32 altars, only 3 were kept after renovation. After the earthquake, the reconstruction of the cathedral was conducted between 1880 and 1902 in the neo-Gothic style by the architect Hermann Bollé with funds provided by Izidor Kršnjavi.

Death 

Mihailović died on 19 February 1891 in Zagreb at the age of 77. He was buried in the cathedral. Liberal magazine Obzor, which he often defied during his lifetime, paid him tribute by publishing an article which stated in part: "[Josip Mihalović] failed to justify fears of the [Croatian] people, ...For him, the realm of gentleness and justice were not empty words.

In 1886, the 50th anniversary of Mihalović's first Mass was celebrated throughout the Archdiocese of Zagreb. It became clear that "he managed to get full sympathy of the incredulous Croatian people with his meekness and wisdom."

References 

Notes

Books
 
 

1814 births
1891 deaths
People from Žitište
Croatian people of Hungarian descent
Serbian people of Hungarian descent
Bishops of Duvno
Archbishops of Zagreb
Bishops appointed by Pope Pius IX
19th-century Hungarian cardinals
Cardinals created by Pope Pius IX